Tulsi Singh Yadav also Known as Tulsi Singh is an Indian politician. He was elected to the Bihar Legislative Assembly from Karakaat as a member of the Samyukta Socialist Party and Janata Dal in 1967, 1969, 1980,1990 and 1995. In 2000, Yadav lost Bihar Legislative Assembly to Arun Singh as a member of Rashtriya Janata Dal. He contested 2009 Lok Sabha election from Karakat constituency as a member of Samajwadi Party but lost to Mahabali Singh. Yadav died on 4 November 2015.

References

People from Rohtas district
Janata Dal politicians
Bihar MLAs 1967–1969
Bihar MLAs 1969–1972
Bihar MLAs 1980–1985
Bihar MLAs 1990–1995
Bihar MLAs 1995–2000
2015 deaths
Rashtriya Janata Dal politicians
Samajwadi Party politicians
Samyukta Socialist Party politicians
Year of birth missing